Ariobarzanes II, surnamed Philopator, "father-loving", (Ariobarzánēs Philopátōr), was the king of Cappadocia from c. 63 BC or 62 BC to c. 51 BC. He was the son of King Ariobarzanes I of Cappadocia and his wife Queen Athenais Philostorgos I. Ariobarzanes II was half Persian and half Greek.

Ariobarzanes II married the princess Athenais Philostorgos II, one of the daughters of King Mithridates VI of Pontus. He was an ineffective ruler, requiring the aid of Gabinius in 57 BC to ward off his enemies. He was successful in maintaining rule over Cappadocia for approximately eight years before being assassinated by Parthian favorites. By his wife, he had two sons: Ariobarzanes III of Cappadocia and Ariarathes X of Cappadocia. He was succeeded by his first son.

References

51 BC deaths
1st-century BC rulers in Asia
Kings of Cappadocia
Year of birth unknown